The Nuragic bronze statuettes (bronzetti in Italian, brunzitos or brunzitus in Sardinian) are typical Nuragic Sardinian bronze sculptures of the final phase of the Bronze Age and the early Iron Age.

During the archaeological excavations in Sardinia, more than 500 bronze statuettes of this type have been discovered, mainly in places of worship like their holy wells, and the so-called megara temples, but also in villages and nuraghes. Several statues were also found in excavations carried out in Etruscan tombs of central Italy from the 9th-8th centuries .

Probably obtained with the lost wax technique, they can measure up to 39 cm. They represent scenes of everyday life of the nuragic people, depicting characters from various social classes, animal figures, warriors, chiefs, divinities, everyday objects and ships.

Archaeologists have not been able yet to date the figures accurately: They were allegedly made between the 9th~6th centuries ; however, the recent discoveries at Orroli and at Ballao of fragments of bronze statues dating from the 13th century BCE have called into question their effective date. Gonzalez (2012) dated the earliest types of bronze statuettes to the 12th-11th centuries .

Gallery

Citations

Bibliography

 
 
 
 
 

Archaeology of Sardinia
Sardinia